Robert Henry Quinn (1928-2014) was a Massachusetts attorney and politician.

Early life
Quinn was born January 30, 1928, in Boston, Massachusetts. He was the youngest of seven children. When Quinn was six his father died.

Quinn received a scholarship to Boston College High School and attended Boston College on a football scholarship. While at BC, he was stricken with tuberculosis and it was believed that he would die. Quinn recovered after spending three years in the hospital. He went on to finish college and graduated from Harvard Law School in 1955.

Political career

Quinn was a member of the Massachusetts House of Representatives from 1957 to 1969 and the speaker of that body from 1967 to 1969. During his tenure in the house, he played a role in the founding of the University of Massachusetts Boston by co-sponsoring the legislation that established the university in conjunction with Massachusetts Senate Majority Leader Maurice A. Donahue.

Quinn was elected Massachusetts Attorney General by the Massachusetts Legislature sitting in Joint Convention following Elliot Richardson's selection as Under Secretary of State. He won a full four-year term in 1970. In 1970, Quinn championed legislation that offered financial incentives to law enforcement officers who pursued higher education, which became known as the "Quinn Bill".

Quinn sought the Democratic nomination for governor in 1974, but was defeated by Michael Dukakis.

Later life and death
Following his defeat, co-founded the Quinn and Morris law firm and was a prominent lobbyist. He also served as chairman of the board of trustees of University of Massachusetts (1981-1986) and the Massachusetts Convention Center Authority.

Quinn died in Falmouth, Massachusetts, on January 12, 2014, at the age of 85.

See also
 Massachusetts House of Representatives' 9th Suffolk district
 1957–1958 Massachusetts legislature
 1959–1960 Massachusetts legislature
 1961–1962 Massachusetts legislature
 1963–1964 Massachusetts legislature
 1965–1966 Massachusetts legislature
 1967–1968 Massachusetts legislature

References

1928 births
2014 deaths
Boston College alumni
Boston College Eagles football players
Boston College High School alumni
Harvard Law School alumni
Massachusetts Attorneys General
Politicians from Boston
Speakers of the Massachusetts House of Representatives
Democratic Party members of the Massachusetts House of Representatives
Lawyers from Boston
20th-century American lawyers